The  is a limited express train service between  and  in Hokkaido, Japan, operated by Hokkaido Railway Company (JR Hokkaido). There are six trains per day running in both directions, with the fastest journeys taking 3 hours 58 minutes.

History
The service commenced as the limited express  on 1 October 1961, operating between Hakodate and Asahikawa using KiHa 80 series DMUs with one return working daily. The service was extended to run between Hakodate and Kushiro from 1967. By 1973, there were three return workings daily. In October 1980, following the opening of New Chitose Airport, services were reorganized, with just one return working daily between Sapporo and Kushiro. From October 1981, the train was rerouted via the Sekishō Line, reducing journey times by approximately one hour. From 22 March 1997, four Ōzora services were upgraded to become  following the introduction of new KiHa 283 series tilting DMUs. The remaining Ōzora services using KiHa 183 series DMUs were phased out by 2001. KiHa 261 series DMUs were introduced on 14 March 2020, and the service has since been returned to simply Ōzora.

Stops
Trains stop at the following stations:

 -  -  - - - -  -  - - -  -  - - - 

Stations in brackets are stations where only some trains stop at.

Rolling stock
The Ōzora is operated by 6-car KiHa 283 series and KiHa 261 series DMUs,  with car 1 at the Kushiro (eastern) end. All cars are no-smoking.

For departures using KiHa 283 series, cars 1, 2 and 4 to 6 are ordinary-class cars with 2+2 seating, and car 3 is a “Green” car with 2+1 seating.

For departures using KiHa 261 series, car 1 is a “Green” car with 2+1 seating, and cars 2 to 6 are ordinary-class cars with 2+2 seating.

Former rolling stock
 KiHa 80 series DMUs
 KiHa 183 series DMUs (1980–2001)

2011 derailment and fire
On 27 May 2011, the Super Ōzora 14 service from Kushiro to Sapporo was brought to an emergency stop inside the  No. 1 Niniu Tunnel in Shimukappu, Hokkaidō, at around 21:55 after car number 2 of the 6-car formation became derailed. The train caught fire, and all of the 245 people on board, including train staff eventually evacuated the train. 39 were treated for smoke inhalation and minor burn injuries. The burnt-out train was removed from the tunnel on 29 May 2011.

References

External links

 JR Hokkaido official website 
 JR Hokkaido official website 

Named passenger trains of Japan
Hokkaido Railway Company
Japanese National Railways
Railway services introduced in 1961
1961 establishments in Japan